The 1824 United States presidential election in Missouri took place between October 26 and December 2, 1824.

The 1824 presidential election was a complex realigning election following the collapse of the prevailing Democratic-Republican Party, resulting in four main candidates each claiming to carry the banner of the party, and competing for influence in different parts of the country. The election was the only one in history to be decided by the House of Representatives under the provisions of the Twelfth Amendment to the United States Constitution after no candidate secured a majority of the electoral vote. It was also the only presidential election in which the candidate who received a plurality of electoral votes (Andrew Jackson) did not become President, a source of great bitterness for Jackson and his supporters, who proclaimed the election of Adams a corrupt bargain.

Voters chose three representatives, or electors to the Electoral College, who voted for President and Vice President. Missouri voted for the Democratic-Republican candidate, Henry Clay.

Results

See also
 United States presidential elections in Missouri

References

https://uselectionatlas.org/RESULTS/state.php?year=1824&f=1&off=0&elect=0&fips=29&submit=Retrieve

Missouri
1824
1824 Missouri elections